Kjell Askildsen (30 September 1929 – 23 September 2021) was a Norwegian writer probably best known for his minimalistic short stories.

Personal life
Askildsen was born in Mandal as a son of bailiff and politician Arne Askildsen (1898–1982) and Aasta Håverstad (1898–1978). Before the Second World War his father was the bailiff of Mandal and Halse og Harkmark from 1928, a board member of the Norwegian Lutheran Mission since 1939, and also a member of the school board and city council. During the war and occupation of Norway, his father was imprisoned in Arkivet twice, before escaping to Sweden in 1944. Two older brothers of Kjell Askildsen were held captive in Grini concentration camp.

After the war, Askildsen enrolled in the Independent Norwegian Brigade Group in Germany. He was married to a German woman for some time. From August 1951 to March 1968 he was married to Edith Dorothea Mathiessen, and from June 1992 he has been married to Gina Giertsen.

Askildsen died on 23 September 2021, at the age of 91.

Writing career
His first book, the short story collection Heretter følger jeg deg helt hjem (1953), raised controversy, especially in Mandal, for its sexual content. After that book, Asklildsen concentrated mainly on novels. He was awarded the Mads Wiel Nygaards Endowment in recognition of his novel, Omgivelser (1969), which was made into the 1973 movie Maria Marusjka, directed by Oddvar Bull Tuhus and starring Peter Lindgren.

From 1982 on, all of Askildsen's published books have been short story collections. It is mainly these books that made him one of the most acclaimed modern writers in Norway. Thomas F's siste nedtegnelser til almenheten (1983) won him the Norwegian Critics Prize for Literature. In 2006, a jury appointed by the newspaper Dagbladet voted that collection the best prose book written in Norway during the last 25 years . He has won other awards as well, almost one for each new publication.

Norwegian bibliography

Short story collections 
 1953 - Heretter følger jeg deg helt hjem (From now on I'll walk you all the way Home)
 1966 - Kulisser (Stage Sets)
 1982 - Ingenting for ingenting (Nothing for Nothing)
 1983 - Thomas F's siste nedtegnelser til almenheten (Thomas F's Last Notes to the Public)
 1987 - En plutselig frigjørende tanke (A Sudden Liberating Thought)
 1991 - Et stort øde landskap (A Great Deserted Landscape)
 1996 - Hundene i Tessaloniki (The Dogs of Thessaloniki)
 1999 - Samlede noveller (Collected Short Stories)
 2005 - Alt som før (Everything As Before)
 2015 - Vennskapets pris (The Cost of Friendship)

Novels 
 1955 - Herr Leonard Leonard (Mister Leonard Leonard)
 1957 - Davids bror (The brother of David)
 1969 - Omgivelser (Scenery)
 1974 - Kjære, kjære Oluf (Dear, dear Oluf)
 1976 - Hverdag (Everyday)

Awards and prizes (selection)
2010 - Sørlandet Honorary Award
2009 – Swedish Academy Nordic Prize
2004 – Det Norske Akademis Pris til minne om Thorleif Dahl
1997 – Oktober Prize
1996 – Brage Prize Honorary Award
1995 – Dobloug Prize
1991 – Norwegian Critics Prize for Literature for Et stort øde landskap
1991 – Aschehoug Prize
1987 – Riksmål Society Literature Prize
1983 – Norwegian Critics Prize for Literature for Thomas Fs siste nedtegnelser til allmennheten
1969 – Mads Wiel Nygaard's Endowment
Ikaros-prisen

References 

Kjell Askildsen's biography and foreign publishers at Aschehoug Agency
Kjell Askildsen at Forlaget Oktober

External links 
 The Resistance Came to Stay. An interview with Kjell Askildsen Video by Louisiana Channel

1929 births
2021 deaths
People from Mandal, Norway
20th-century Norwegian novelists
Norwegian male short story writers
Norwegian Critics Prize for Literature winners
Dobloug Prize winners
20th-century Norwegian short story writers
20th-century Norwegian male writers
Norwegian expatriates in Sweden